Neoglaphyrites is a goniatitid ammonite that lived during the latest Pennsylvanian and early Permian. Delicate growth lines forming ventral and lateral sinuses and ventrolateral and dorsolateral salients have been found on Canadian Arctic specimens. The suture is characterized by the ventral lobe split into two broad prongs that are separated by a high median ventral saddle; prongs closely approximate the width of the first lateral lobe. The first lateral saddle is evenly rounded and is nearly symmetrical. The umbilical lobe is V-shaped and internal lobes are deep and narrow.

General consensus is that Neoglaphyrites belongs in the Bisatoceratidae, although this has not always been the case.  Miller et al 1957, in the Treatise on Invertebrate Paleontology, placed Neoglaphyrites in the Neoicoceratidae as a synonym for Eoasianites.  Saunders 1999 is uncertain which family to include Neoglaphyrites in, but includes it in the Somoholotaceae.

References

 Neoglaphyrites entry in GONIAT Online 6/14/12
W. B. Saunders, D. M. Work, & S. V. Nikolaeva, 1999. Evolution of Complexity in Paleozoic Ammonoid Sutures, Supplementary Material. Science Magazine 

Ammonites of North America
Goniatitida genera
Bisatoceratidae
Permian ammonites
Pennsylvanian first appearances
Cisuralian genus extinctions
Paleozoic life of Nunavut